is a railway station located in the city of Aomori, Aomori Prefecture, Japan, operated by the East Japan Railway Company (JR East).

Lines

Station layout
The station  has one side platform and one island platform serving three tracks, connected to the station building by a footbridge. The station has a Midori no Madoguchi staffed ticket office.

Platforms
 

Note: Track 3 is used primarily for freight trains changing direction.

Route bus
Aomori City Bus
For.Aomori Station via Ishie, Nishitaki and Furukawa
For.Namioka Station via Daishaka
For.Magonai via Tsurugasaka
For.Furukawa via Okamachi, Aburakawa and Okidate
For.Nogiwa-Danchi via Okachimachi and Aburakawa
Kōnan Bus
For.Kuroishi via Namioka and Tobinai
For.Goshogawara via Daishaka and Harako
For.Yadame via Aomori Station and Shinmachi

History
It took its present name on 11 September 1915. With the privatization of JNR on 1 April 1, 1987, it came under the operational control of JR East.

Passenger statistics
In fiscal 2018, the station was used by an average of 365 passengers daily (boarding passengers only).

Surrounding area
Aomori city hall Shinjō office

See also
 List of Railway Stations in Japan

References

External links

  

Stations of East Japan Railway Company
Railway stations in Aomori Prefecture
Ōu Main Line
Railway stations in Japan opened in 1894
Aomori (city)